Boigny-sur-Bionne is a commune in the Loiret department in north-central France.

Population

Economy
IBM has an office in Boigny-sur-Bionne.

See also
Communes of the Loiret department

References

Communes of Loiret